The Lužane bus bombing occurred on May 1, 1999 during the NATO bombing of Yugoslavia, when NATO missiles targeting a bridge in Kosovo hit a bus. The bus was hit on the Lužane north of Pristina. On that day, 46 civilians of Serb and Albanian ethnicity were killed. Among the victims were 14 children. One section plunged off the bridge into the river below. Amnesty International believes that NATO did not always meet its legal obligation in selection targets of attack, one of which includes bombing of this bridge in Lužane, where NATO forces failed to suspend the attack after it was evident that they had struck the civilians. 
The bus (Niš-Ekspres) was on a regular express service, linking Pristina and Niš.

See also 

 Grdelica train bombing
Varvarin bridge bombing
 Koriša bombing
 NATO bombing of Albanian refugees near Gjakova

Notes

References

Aerial operations and battles of the Kosovo War
1999 in Kosovo
NATO airstrikes
Bus bombings in Europe
History of Pristina
Civilian casualties in the Kosovo War
Incidents involving NATO
May 1999 events in Europe
20th century in Pristina
United States war crimes